Jaroslav Sysel (born 24 October 1908, date of death unknown) was a Czech wrestler. He competed in the men's freestyle middleweight at the 1936 Summer Olympics.

References

External links
 

1908 births
Year of death missing
Czech male sport wrestlers
Olympic wrestlers of Czechoslovakia
Wrestlers at the 1936 Summer Olympics
People from Benešov
Sportspeople from the Central Bohemian Region